John G. Breslin was a Democratic politician from the U.S. State of Ohio. He was elected to the Ohio House of Representatives, and was Speaker at age 24. He later was Ohio State Treasurer and in the railroad business.

Biography
Breslin was born at Lebanon, Pennsylvania in about 1824. Both his parents died when he was about three years old, and he was adopted by a family named McKissen. They moved to Dayton, Ohio when John was a boy, and he decided to make his own way at age 12.

At age 12, Breslin walked to Columbus, Ohio, where he hired on as a printers apprentice to Samuel Medary, editor of the Columbus Statesman, a Democratic paper. He applied his time to work and study for six years. In 1842, Colonel Medary received a letter from Democrats in Tiffin, Ohio, asking him to recommend a young man to edit a Democratic paper in their city, and Medary recommended Breslin. Breslin published the first edition of the Seneca Advertiser May 6, 1842, and he continued with the paper until 1854.

Breslin was elected to the Ohio House of Representatives in 1848, and was re-elected in 1849. In 1848 he was selected by his peers as Speaker of the House at age 24.

In 1851, Ohio adopted a new constitution. The office of Ohio State Treasurer became elective, and Breslin ran against the Whig incumbent Albert A. Bliss, and won office.

While Breslin was Treasurer in Columbus, he met and married Anna C. Borland of Lancaster, Ohio. He was re-elected in 1853, but lost to Republican William H. Gibson in 1855 while seeking a third term. Gibson was a fellow Tiffin resident, and was related by marriage to Breslin. Breslin served until the second Monday of January, 1856, and then moved back to Tiffin.

In June, 1857, Gibson was forced to resign, when it became public that Breslin had left the Treasury several hundred thousand dollars short at the end of his term. Breslin assured Gibson the money would be made good. Gibson was found guilty of nothing more than being too trusting. Breslin removed to Canada to avoid the unpleasantness.

After residing in Lancaster, Ohio for a year and a half, Breslin and his wife moved to Huntington, West Virginia in 1871, where he was general ticket agent for the Chesapeake and Ohio Railway. He worked there until his death February 22, 1889. His was buried at Greenlawn Cemetery, Tiffin. His widow moved back to Lancaster.

References

External links
Breslin Treasury defalcation March 12, 1859 in New York Times

1824 births
1889 deaths
19th-century American newspaper publishers (people)
Chesapeake and Ohio Railway
Politicians from Columbus, Ohio
Politicians from Huntington, West Virginia
People from Tiffin, Ohio
Speakers of the Ohio House of Representatives
Democratic Party members of the Ohio House of Representatives
State treasurers of Ohio
People from Lebanon, Pennsylvania
Politicians from Dayton, Ohio
19th-century American journalists
American male journalists
19th-century American male writers
19th-century American politicians
Journalists from Ohio
Journalists from Pennsylvania